The Cathedral Basilica of Saint John the Baptist is the main Roman Catholic church building of Salto. It is the see of the Roman Catholic Diocese of Salto since 1939.

History
Designed by the Salesian Ernesto Vespignani, the style of the cathedral is Eclecticism, with a predominantly Baroque façade. It was consecrated in 1889, dedicated to St. John the Baptist. In its interior stands out several paintings by Zorrilla de San Martín and the Christ in bronze by Edmundo Pratti.

On 9 May 1988, Pope John Paul II visited the cathedral.

On 8 April 1997, the cathedral was declared a basilica minor.

Same devotion
There are other churches in Uruguay dedicated to St. John the Baptist:
 St. John the Baptist Parish Church in Pocitos, Montevideo
 St. John the Baptist Parish Church in Santa Lucía
 St. John the Baptist Parish Church in San Bautista
 St. John the Baptist Parish Church in Río Branco
 St. John the Baptist Parish Church in Mercedes
 St. John the Baptist Chapel in Ismael Cortinas

See also
 List of Roman Catholic cathedrals in Uruguay
 Roman Catholic Diocese of Salto

References

External links
 
 Diocese of Salto - CEU 
 Pictures of the Cathedral

Roman Catholic church buildings in Salto Department
Salto
Eclectic architecture
Roman Catholic churches completed in 1889
Basilica churches in Uruguay
19th-century Roman Catholic church buildings in Uruguay